Antonio Alberto Calvento (February 1, 1954 – October 9, 2017) was a prominent Filipino broadcast journalist and columnist. He was the host of Calvento Files, a crime and investigative documentary show which aired on ABS-CBN (together with ABS-CBN News and Current Affairs) from 1995 to 1998.

Personal life
Calvento was married to Carmen de la Rosa with three children.

Death
Calvento died of stage 4 pancreatic cancer on October 9, 2017, at the Asian Hospital and Medical Center at the age of 63.

Filmography

Screenplay

Story

Advertising and Promotions Manager

Advertising Manager

Production manager

Actor

TV show

Radio Show Producer

Awards, honors and recognition
Golden Scroll for Journalism

References

1954 births
2017 deaths
Deaths from cancer in the Philippines
Deaths from multiple organ failure
Deaths from pancreatic cancer
Filipino columnists
Filipino screenwriters
Filipino writers
People from Manila